Gene Francis Warren Jr. (July 22, 1941 – November 28, 2019) was an American visual effects artist. He was best known for his work in the first two Terminator film series, and he won an Academy Award in the category Best Visual Effects for the film Terminator 2: Judgment Day. Warren died in November 2019 at his home in Hollywood Hills, California, at the age of 78.

Selected filmography 
 Terminator 2: Judgment Day (1991; co-won with Dennis Muren, Stan Winston and Robert Skotak)

References

External links 

1941 births
2019 deaths
People from Los Angeles
Visual effects artists
Visual effects supervisors
Best Visual Effects Academy Award winners